College of Engineering and Management, Kolaghat (CEMK) is a  Govt. Aided engineering college offering B.Tech. courses located in Kolaghat Thermal Power Plant Township of West Bengal Power Development Corporation, Kolaghat, West Bengal. The college was established in the year of 1998 with the support from West Bengal Power Development Corporation Limited (WBPDCL). Courses are accredited by the National Board of Accreditation (NBA) and  approved by All India Council for Technical Education (AICTE), New Delhi.

The college was financed by the World Bank under TEQIP II programme as a government aided engineering college for modernizing it's laboratories and improving overall infrastructure. The college is sponsored by Vidyasagar Society for Integrated Learning, Kolkata and chaired by Minister-In-Charge, Power, Government of West Bengal. It has a campus area of 32 acres (130,000 m2) and is fully residential for faculty and staffs. The college offers full-time engineering programs leading to four-year B.Tech. degree from Maulana Abul Kalam Azad University of Technology (MAKAUT) formerly known as
West Bengal University of Technology (WBUT).

Courses offered 
College of Engineering and Management, Kolaghat offers full-time (four-year) B.Tech degrees to the following departments:

Infrastructure 
Facilities includes the administrative building, library, workshops, boys and girls hostels, play grounds, and staff quarters. The college has an ATM,a hospital,a bank and a market place near the campus. The college provides 350 Mbit/s high speed internet connectivity to each hostel for each student.

Awards and recognitions 
 The Institute received INR 15 crore grants from the World Bank under TEQIP II programme as a government aided engineering college.

See also 
 List of institutions of higher education in West Bengal

References 

Colleges affiliated to West Bengal University of Technology
Academic institutions formerly affiliated with Vidyasagar University
Universities and colleges in Purba Medinipur district
Engineering colleges in West Bengal
1998 establishments in West Bengal
Educational institutions established in 1998